Reeling with PJ Harvey (sometimes simply known as Reeling) is a video album by English alternative rock musician PJ Harvey, released on 11 April 1994 on PolyGram. The film was directed by Maria Mochnacz and was only released on VHS.

Most of the footage featured in Reeling is live footage from a performance at the London Forum in May 1993. Other footage featured throughout includes backstage footage, in-studio footage from the Rid of Me sessions, extracts from interviews, and two full-length music videos of "50ft Queenie" and "Man-Size."

Track listing
"Snake" (live) 2:10
"Naked Cousin" (live) 4:07
"50ft Queenie" 2:23
"Victory" (live) 4:00
"Man-Size Sextet" (live) 2:59
"Primed and Ticking" (live) 3:21
"M-Bike" (live) 3:00
"Wang Dang Doodle" (live) 3:07
"Missed" (live) 4:54
"Hook" (live) 4:40
"Rid of Me" (live) 5:00
"Me-Jane" (live) 3:00
"Man-Size" 3:16
"Legs" 3:39

Also includes backstage footage, in-studio footage and extracts from interviews throughout.

Personnel
PJ Harvey Trio
PJ Harvey – vocals, guitar
Steve Vaughan – bass
Rob Ellis – drums, percussion, backing vocals

Crew
Maria Mochnacz – director, producer, recording (tour footage)
Peter Fowler – producer, recording (live footage)
Nick Ryle – executive producer
John Mayes – on-line editor
Stuart Robertson – on-line editor
Pete Thomas – sound producer
Cormac Tohill – sound engineer
Will Shapland – sound recording
Dave Porter – sound recording
Mark Johnson – sound recording
Stuart Luck – camera operator
Derek Penell – camera operator
Peter Edwards – camera operator
Mark Reeson – camera operator
Simon Jacobs – camera operator
Jo Higson – camera assistant
Chris Libert – camera assistant
Steve Court – vision engineer

See also
Rid of Me (1993)
4-Track Demos (1993)
PJ Harvey discography

References

PJ Harvey albums
1994 video albums